Javier Fernández is the name of:
 Javier Fernández (Spanish politician) (born 1948), Spanish politician and President of the Principality of Asturias
 Javier Fernández government, the regional government of Javier Fernández
 Javier Fernández Aguado (born 1961), Spanish PhD in Economics, author and expert in Management
 Javier Fernández (judoka) (born 1981), Spanish judoka
 Javi Fernández (footballer, born 1988) (born 1988), Spanish footballer
 Javier Fernández (figure skater) (born 1991), Spanish figure skater
 Javier Fernández (footballer, born 1994), Uruguayan footballer
 Javi Fernández (footballer, born 1997), Spanish footballer
 Javier Fernandez (American politician), member of the Florida House of Representatives

See also
 Francisco Javier Fernández (disambiguation)
 Javier Ferrer Fernández (born 1961), Puerto Rican attorney
 Javi Navas (born 1991), Spanish footballer born Javier Fernández Herranz
 Bicho (footballer, born 1996), Spanish footballer born Javier Fernández Abruñedo